Arlen Quindoy Aguilar (July 9, 1925 – July 18, 2003), also known by his screen name César Ramírez, was a Filipino actor who was a leading man for Sampaguita Pictures. He was famous for his portrayal of a Philippines' mythical hero, "Bernardo Carpio".

He was married to Alicia Vergel. They had two children, Ace and Beverly. Sometime after retiring from the film business, Ramirez moved to Los Angeles, California in the United States.

He died of cardiac arrest on July 18, 2003.

Filmography
 Huling Patak ng Dugo (1950) [Sampaguita]
 Tenyente Ramirez (1950) [Sampaguita]
 Campo O' Donnell (1950) [Sampaguita]
 13 Hakbang (1950) [Sampaguita]
 Bernardo Carpio (1951) [Sampaguita]
 Tres Muskiteros (1951) [Sampaguita]
 Madam X (1952) [Sampaguita]
 Palasig  (1952) [Sampaguita]
 El Indio (1953) [Sampaguita]
 Diwani  (1953) [Sampaguita]
 Reyna Bandida (1953) [Sampaguita]
 Ukkala (1954) [Sampaguita]
 MN (1954) [Sampaguita]
 Tres Ojos (1954)[Sampaguita]
 Dumagit (1954) [Sampaguita]
 R.O.T.C. (1954)  [Sampaguita]
 Artista (1955)[Sampaguita]
 Kuripot (1955) [Sampaguita]
 Uhaw sa Pag-ibig (1955) [Sampaguita]
 Lupang Kayumangi (1955) [Sampaguita]
 Walang Panginoon (1956) [Everlasting]
 Haring Espada (1956) [People's]
 Montalan Brothers (1956) [Larry Santiago]
 Kahariang Bato (1957) [Tamaraw]
 Bicol Express (1957) [Premiere]
 Aliping Maharlika (1957)  [Everlasting]
 Matira ang Matibay (1958) [Tamaraw Studio]
 Ramir (1958) [Everlasting]
 Sisang Tabak (1958)  [Cinematic Phil Inc.]
 Sa Pagitan Ng Dalawang Mata (1963)  [People's Pictures]
 7 Cobra (1964) [Good Harvest Productions]

References

External links
 

1929 births
2003 deaths
Filipino expatriates in the United States
Filipino male film actors